The salad oil scandal, also referred to as the soybean scandal, was an American major corporate scandal in 1963 that caused over $180 million ($ billion today) in losses to corporations including American Express, Bank of America and Bank Leumi, as well as many international trading companies. The scandal's ability to push otherwise cautious and conservative lenders into increasingly risky practices has prompted some comparisons to later financial crises including the 2007–2008 subprime mortgage crisis.

The scandal involved the Allied Crude Vegetable Oil company in New Jersey in the United States, owned by Anthony "Tino" De Angelis, a former commodities broker. De Angelis had been in trouble with the law previously for supplying schools with beef from uncertified sources under the  National School Lunch Act.

Fraud
De Angelis was awarded a contract with Food for Peace, a federal program which sold excess food stocks to poor countries. He discovered that he could obtain loans based upon Allied's fraudulently-inflated inventory of salad oil. Ships supposedly full of salad oil for Allied would dock and inspectors would certify the cargo, allowing Allied to post the oil as collateral and obtain millions of dollars in bank loans.  In reality, the ships tanks contained only water, with a few feet of salad oil floating on top to trick inspectors. When inspectors audited Allied's facilities, the company would transfer the same oil stock from tank to tank to fool the inspectors while entertaining them during lunch. In all, Allied posted 1.8 billion pounds of soybean oil as collateral to fraudulently obtain $180 million in loans, when the actual stock was a mere 110 million pounds.

Impact 
The scandal was exposed when the Russian soybean market did not open up, and soybean prices fell drastically as a result, causing the investors to attempt to cash in. American Express stock dropped more than 50% as a result, which cost the company nearly $58 million.  De Angelis was convicted of fraud and conspiracy charges in connection with the scandal and served seven years in prison, gaining his release in 1972.

See also
The Great Salad Oil Swindle (book)

References
Notes

Corporate scandals
Corporate crime
1963 in the United States
1963 in economics